The Tianjin Olympic Center, often colloquially referred to as the Water Drop, is a sports complex with a multi-use stadium in Tianjin, China. Construction started in August 2003 and was completed in August 2007. It is the home stadium of Tianjin TEDA.

The stadium hosted games for the 2007 FIFA Women's World Cup and Football preliminaries at the 2008 Summer Olympics. It also hosted the Athletics competitions at the 2017 National Games of China.

It covers 78,000 square meters and has a capacity of 54,696 seats. The stadium is nicknamed "The Water Drop" because the outside of the venue was designed to resemble a drop of water. The stadium cost nearly 1.5 billion Yuan. The architects were AXS Satow.

In 2011, the venue hosted a football match between Tianjin TEDA F.C. and the Spanish side Real Madrid.

The stadium houses sports facilities, exhibition halls, conference rooms and gyms. It also has the capacity for entertainment and shopping complexes. American singer and recording artist Mariah Carey performed The Elusive Chanteuse Show in the stadium on 17 October 2014 and thus making her as the only international artist to have visited Tianjin.

References

Beijing2008.cn profile

Football venues in Tianjin
Athletics (track and field) venues in China
2007 FIFA Women's World Cup stadiums
Venues of the 2008 Summer Olympics
Olympic football venues
Sports venues in Tianjin
Tianjin Tianhai F.C.
Sports venues completed in 2007